"The Greenish Bird" is a Mexican fairy tale collected by Joel Gomez in La Encantada, Texas from a seventy-four-year-old woman, Mrs. P.E.

It combines Aarne–Thompson types 425, "The Search for the Lost Husband", and 432, the Prince as Bird.  Other types of the first type include The Black Bull of Norroway, The Brown Bear of Norway, East of the Sun and West of the Moon, The Enchanted Pig, The Tale of the Hoodie, Master Semolina, The Enchanted Snake, The Sprig of Rosemary, The Daughter of the Skies, and White-Bear-King-Valemon.  Others of the second include The Feather of Finist the Falcon, The Green Knight, and The Blue Bird.

Synopsis
Of three sisters only Luisa sewed; her sisters hung out in bars instead.  A greenish bird that was a prince came and wooed her.  Her sisters found out and put knives in the window so he was wounded.  He told her to that he lived in crystal towers on the plains of Merlin.

She bought herself iron shoes and set out.  She finds the Sun's house, where his mother warns her that he will eat her; she nevertheless hides until the mother calms her son down, whereupon he does not know the way but sends her to the Moon.  The same thing happens with the Moon, and then with the Wind, but the Wind can not send her anywhere.  She happens on a hermit who can summon all the birds and animals, and an old eagle says that the Greenish Bird is to marry, except that he is very ill, and if she kills him a cow, he could take her.  When they flew, he asked for meat, and she gave him another leg.  When she was out, she offered to cut off her own leg, but the eagle said he was testing her.

At the prince's, she worked in the kitchen and played the guitar.  This cured the prince.  The prince then said every woman must make a cup of cocoa, and whoever's he drank, he would marry the woman.  He drank Luisa's, not caring whether it was bitter, and married her.

Source 
The informant learned it from her mother, who was famed for her guitar playing, which may explain that motif.

Variants 
In an Ecuadorian tale titled La Princesa La Cara de la Necesidad, a prince throws a pebble at an old woman and breaks a jar she was carrying. The old woman says the prince did it because he does not know the titular princess "La Cara de La Necesidad", and shows him her picture. The prince decides to go in search of this princess. He goes to the shore, embarks on a ship and sails to the princess's kingdom. He puts on a suit and a pair of shoes, and disembarks. Some soldiers say the prince killed their prince, and arrest him. In the dungeons, another prisoner tells the prince the princess La Cara de La Necesidad brings food for the inmates. The princess learns the prince is innocent and goes to talk to her father. The king summons the prince in front of the populace, who shout for him to be executed. The prince proves his identity, and is banished from the kingdom back to his homeland. He eventually loses his mind, and is locked in a high tower. Meanwhile, the princess La Cara de La Necesidad, longing for the prince, decides to go after him. She passes by a red house that belongs to the Sun and his mother (where she gains a magical tablecloth), a white house that belongs to the moon and his mother (where she gains a chicken that hatchen golden chicks) and the house of the Wind and his mother. The Wind agrees to take the princess to "las torres altas y calladas del rey turco" (the prince's location), and changes her to a wrinkled and lame old woman in shabby clothes. The princess arrives at prince Gustavo's castle, and, saying her name is Cipriana, finds work as a chicken herd. In the chicken coop, the princess takes out the hen, the magic tablecloth and a magical comb (that the Wind gave her), and bribes the queen for three nights with the prince, so that her presence may cure him. For the first two nights, the prince is fast asleep due to his medicine, but sees the princess on the third night and regains his sanity. They then marry and live happily.

Motifs 
The conclusion is unusual in that while some domestic skill is usually the test, it is also usually only the heroine who can perform it, as in Black Bull of Norroway and East of the Sun and West of the Moon, where only she can wash the shirt.  Curing the prince, where it occurs, as in The Enchanted Snake, is usually enough to win him.

The episode of the journey on the eagle's back is parallel to similar events in many fairy tales, where a hero needs to feed pieces of meat to the eagle for the remainder of the journey, otherwise it will not complete its flight. In this regard, folklorist scholarship recognizes its similarities with the tale of Etana helping an eagle, a tale type later classified as Aarne–Thompson–Uther ATU 537, "The Eagle as helper: hero carried on the wings of a helpful eagle".

Sayings
The tale explained that a person who asks for meat is an "old eagle" because the eagle asked for meat while flying.

References

Mexican fairy tales
Fiction about shapeshifting
ATU 400-459